The 1979–80 season was Mansfield Town's 43rd season in the Football League and 15th in the Third Division they finished in 23rd position with 36 points suffering relegation to the Fourth Division.

Final league table

Results

Football League Third Division

FA Cup

League Cup

Anglo-Scottish Cup

Squad statistics
 Squad list sourced from

References
General
 Mansfield Town 1979–80 at soccerbase.com (use drop down list to select relevant season)

Specific

Mansfield Town F.C. seasons
Mansfield Town